The Tom Tellez Track at Carl Lewis International Complex, also known as simply Tom Tellez Track or Carl Lewis International Complex, is home to the Houston Cougars men's and women's outdoor track and field teams and women's soccer team. The facility is named after Tom Tellez and Carl Lewis, two of the most notable individuals to have been associated with the program.

The track features a European style design with wider curves and shorter straightaways than most U.S. tracks to enhance the speed of runners.

References

External links
Official website

Houston Cougars sports venues
Athletics (track and field) venues in Texas
College track and field venues in the United States 
Soccer venues in Houston
Sports venues in Houston
2000 establishments in Texas
Sports venues completed in 2000